Olybria is a genus of snout moths erected by Carl Heinrich in 1956.

Species
 Olybria aliculella (Hulst, 1887)
 Olybria furciferella (Dyar, 1904)

References

Phycitinae
Pyralidae genera
Taxa named by Carl Heinrich